Justin Murisier (born 8 January 1992) is a Swiss World Cup alpine ski racer who competes in giant slalom and the speed disciplines of downhill and super-G. Earlier, he also competed in slalom.

Career
Born in Martigny, Valais, Murisier has competed at three Winter Olympics and three World Championships. His first World Cup podium came in December 2020 at Alta Badia, Italy.

Murisier's father is a cousin of alpine ski racer William Besse (b.1968).

World Cup results

Season standings

Race podiums
 0 wins
 1 podium (1 GS); 34 top tens

World Championship results

Olympic results

References

External links

Swiss Ski Team – alpine skiing – Justin Murisier – 
 – 

1992 births
Living people
People from Martigny
Alpine skiers at the 2014 Winter Olympics
Alpine skiers at the 2018 Winter Olympics
Alpine skiers at the 2022 Winter Olympics
Swiss male alpine skiers
Olympic alpine skiers of Switzerland
Sportspeople from Valais
21st-century Swiss people